Wendilgarda is a genus of ray spiders that was first described by Eugen von Keyserling in 1886.

Species
 it contains fourteen species and one subspecies, found in Asia, the Caribbean, Central America, São Tomé and Príncipe, Brazil, and Mexico:
Wendilgarda assamensis Fage, 1924 – India, China
Wendilgarda atricolor (Simon, 1907) – São Tomé and Príncipe
Wendilgarda clara Keyserling, 1886 – Caribbean, Guatemala to Brazil
Wendilgarda galapagensis Archer, 1953 – Costa Rica (Cocos Is.)
Wendilgarda housaiyuae Lin & Li, 2022 – China
Wendilgarda liliwensis Barrion & Litsinger, 1995 – Philippines
Wendilgarda mexicana Keyserling, 1886 (type) – Mexico, Central America, Cuba
Wendilgarda muji Miller, Griswold & Yin, 2009 – China
Wendilgarda mustelina Simon, 1898 – St. Vincent
Wendilgarda m. arnouxi Lopez & Emerit, 1986 – Guadeloupe
Wendilgarda nigra Keyserling, 1886 – Brazil
Wendilgarda nipponica Shinkai, 2009 – Japan
Wendilgarda panjanensis Barrion, Barrion-Dupo & Heong, 2013 – China
Wendilgarda ruficeps Suzuki, 2019 – Japan
Wendilgarda sinensis Zhu & Wang, 1992 – China

Formerly included:
W. bicolor Keyserling, 1886 (Transferred to Plato)
W. coddingtoni Zhu, Zhang & Chen, 2001 (Transferred to Karstia)
W. guacharo Brignoli, 1972 (Transferred to Plato)
W. miranda Brignoli, 1972 (Transferred to Plato)

See also
 List of Theridiosomatidae species

References

Further reading

Araneomorphae genera
Spiders of Africa
Spiders of Asia
Spiders of North America
Spiders of South America
Taxa named by Eugen von Keyserling
Theridiosomatidae